The economy of Canada is a highly developed mixed economy. It is the 8th-largest GDP by nominal and 15th-largest GDP by PPP in the world. As with other developed nations, the country's economy is dominated by the service industry which employs about three quarters of Canadians. It has the world's third-largest proven oil reserves and is the fourth-largest exporter of crude oil. It is also the fifth-largest exporter of natural gas.

According to the Corruption Perceptions Index, Canada is perceived as one of the least corrupt countries in the world, and is one of the world's top ten trading nations, with a highly globalized economy. , Canada is ranked 15th on The Heritage Foundation's index of economic freedom. Its average household disposable income per capita is "well above" the OECD average. The Toronto Stock Exchange is the eighth-largest stock exchange in the world by market capitalization, listing over 1,500 companies with a combined market capitalization of over US$3 trillion.

In 2021, Canadian trade in goods and services reached  trillion. Canada's exports totalled over  billion, while its imported goods were worth over  billion, of which approximately  billion originated from the United States,  billion from non-U.S. sources. In 2018, Canada had a trade deficit in goods of  billion and a trade deficit in services of  billion.
Canada is unusual among developed countries in the importance of the primary sector, with the logging and energy industries being two of Canada's most important. Canada also has a sizable manufacturing sector, based in Central Canada, with the automobile industry and aircraft industry being especially important. With the world's longest coastline, Canada has the eighth-largest commercial fishing and seafood industry in the world. Canada is one of the global leaders of the entertainment software industry. It is a member of the APEC, G7, G20, OECD and WTO, and was formerly a member of NAFTA until the USMCA came into force in 2020. In Canada, the USMCA is officially known as the Canada–United States–Mexico Agreement (CUSMA) in English and the Accord Canada–États-Unis–Mexique (ACEUM) in French.

Overview

With the exception of a few island nations in the Caribbean, Canada is the only major North American country to use the parliamentary system of government. As a result, Canada has developed its own social and political institutions, distinct from most other countries in the world. Though the Canadian economy is closely integrated with the American economy, it has developed unique economic institutions.

The Canadian economic system generally combines elements of private enterprise and public enterprise. Many aspects of public enterprise, most notably the development of an extensive social welfare system to redress social and economic inequities, were adopted after the end of World War II in 1945.

Approximately 89% of Canada's land is Crown land. Canada has one of the highest levels of economic freedom in the world. Today Canada closely resembles the U.S. in its market-oriented economic system and pattern of production. As of 2019, Canada has 56 companies in the Forbes Global 2000 list, ranking ninth just behind South Korea and ahead of Saudi Arabia.

International trade makes up a large part of the Canadian economy, particularly of its natural resources. In 2009, agriculture, energy, forestry and mining exports accounted for about 58% of Canada's total exports. Machinery, equipment, automotive products and other manufactures accounted for a further 38% of exports in 2009. In 2009, exports accounted for about 30% of Canada's GDP. The United States is by far its largest trading partner, accounting for about 73% of exports and 63% of imports as of 2009. Canada's combined exports and imports ranked 8th among all nations in 2006.

About 4% of Canadians are directly employed in primary resource fields, and they account for 6.2% of GDP. They are still paramount in many parts of the country. Many, if not most, towns in northern Canada, where agriculture is difficult, exist because of a nearby mine or source of timber. Canada is a world leader in the production of many natural resources such as gold, nickel, uranium, diamonds, lead, and in recent years, crude petroleum, which, with the world's second-largest oil reserves, is taking an increasingly prominent position in natural resources extraction. Several of Canada's largest companies are based in natural resource industries, such as Encana, Cameco, Goldcorp, and Barrick Gold. The vast majority of these products are exported, mainly to the United States. There are also many secondary and service industries that are directly linked to primary ones. For instance one of Canada's largest manufacturing industries is the pulp and paper sector, which is directly linked to the logging business.

The reliance on natural resources has several effects on the Canadian economy and Canadian society. While manufacturing and service industries are easy to standardize, natural resources vary greatly by region. This ensures that differing economic structures developed in each region of Canada, contributing to Canada's strong regionalism. At the same time the vast majority of these resources are exported, integrating Canada closely into the international economy. Howlett and Ramesh argue that the inherent instability of such industries also contributes to greater government intervention in the economy, to reduce the social impact of market changes.

Natural resource industries also raise important questions of sustainability. Despite many decades as a leading producer, there is little risk of depletion. Large discoveries continue to be made, such as the massive nickel find at Voisey's Bay. Moreover, the far north remains largely undeveloped as producers await higher prices or new technologies as many operations in this region are not yet cost effective. In recent decades Canadians have become less willing to accept the environmental destruction associated with exploiting natural resources. High wages and Aboriginal land claims have also curbed expansion. Instead, many Canadian companies have focused their exploration, exploitation and expansion activities overseas where prices are lower and governments more amenable. Canadian companies are increasingly playing important roles in Latin America, Southeast Asia, and Africa.

The depletion of renewable resources has raised concerns in recent years. After decades of escalating overutilization the cod fishery all but collapsed in the 1990s, and the Pacific salmon industry also suffered greatly. The logging industry, after many years of activism, has in recent years moved to a more sustainable model, or to other countries.

Data 
The following table shows the main economic indicators in 1980–2021 (with IMF staff estimates for 2022–2027). Inflation below 5% is in green.

Unemployment rate

Export trade

Export trade from Canada measured in US dollars. In 2021, Canada exported US$503.4 billion.

That dollar amount reflects a 19.5% gain since 2017 and a 29.1% increase from 2020 to 2021.

Import trade
Import trade in 2017 measured in US dollars.

Measuring productivity
Productivity measures are key indicators of economic performance and a key source of economic growth and competitiveness. The Organisation for Economic Co-operation and Development (OECD)'s Compendium of Productivity Indicators, published annually, presents a broad overview of productivity levels and growth in member nations, highlighting key measurement issues. It analyses the role of "productivity as the main driver of economic growth and convergence" and the "contributions of labour, capital and MFP in driving economic growth". According to the definition above "MFP is often interpreted as the contribution to economic growth made by factors such as technical and organisational innovation" (OECD 2008,11). Measures of productivity include Gross Domestic Product (GDP)(OECD 2008,11) and multifactor productivity.

Multifactor productivity

Another productivity measure, used by the OECD, is the long-term trend in multifactor productivity (MFP) also known as total factor productivity (TFP). This indicator assesses an economy's "underlying productive capacity ('potential output'), itself an important measure of the growth possibilities of economies and of inflationary pressures". MFP measures the residual growth that cannot be explained by the rate of change in the services of labour, capital and intermediate outputs, and is often interpreted as the contribution to economic growth made by factors such as technical and organisational innovation. (OECD 2008,11)

According to the OECD's annual economic survey of Canada in June 2012, Canada has experienced weak growth of multi-factor productivity (MFP) and has been declining further since 2002. One of the ways MFP growth is raised is by boosting innovation and Canada's innovation indicators such as business R&D and patenting rates were poor. Raising MFP growth is "needed to sustain rising living standards, especially as the population ages".

Since 2010 productivity growth has picked up, almost entirely driven by above average multifactor productivity growth. However, productivity on the whole still lags behind the upper half of OECD countries such as the United States. Canada's productivity is now around the median OECD productivity, close to that of Australia. More can be done to increase productivity, such as increasing the productivity of capital through improving the capital stock to output ratio and capital quality. This could be achieved through the liberalization of internal trade barriers, as suggested in the OECD's latest Canadian economic survey.

Bank of Canada
The mandate of the central bank—the Bank of Canada is to conduct monetary policy that "preserves the value of money by keeping inflation low and stable".

Monetary Policy Report
The Bank of Canada issues its bank rate announcement through its Monetary Policy Report which is released eight times a year. The Bank of Canada, a federal crown corporation, has the responsibility of Canada's monetary system. Under the inflation-targeting monetary policy that has been the cornerstone of Canada's monetary and fiscal policy since the early 1990s, the Bank of Canada sets an inflation target The inflation target was set at 2 per cent, which is the midpoint of an inflation range of 1 to 3 per cent. They established a set of inflation-reduction targets to keep inflation "low, stable and predictable" and to foster "confidence in the value of money", contribute to Canada's sustained growth, employment gains and improved standard of living.

In a January 9, 2019 statement on the release of the Monetary Policy Report, Bank of Canada Governor Stephen S. Poloz summarized major events since the October report, such as "negative economic consequences" of the US-led trade war with China. In response to the ongoing trade war "bond yields have fallen, yield curves have flattened even more and stock markets have repriced significantly" in "global financial markets". In Canada, low oil prices will impact Canada's "macroeconomic outlook". Canada's housing sector is not stabilizing as quickly as anticipated.

Inflation targeting
During the period that John Crow was Governor of the Bank of Canada—1987 to 1994— there was a worldwide recession and the bank rate rose to around 14% and unemployment topped 11%. Although since that time inflation-targeting has been adopted by "most advanced-world central banks", in 1991 it was innovative and Canada was an early adopter when the then-Finance Minister Michael Wilson approved the Bank of Canada's first inflation-targeting in the 1991 federal budget. The inflation target was set at 2 per cent. Inflation is measured by the total consumer price index (CPI). In 2011 the Government of Canada and the Bank of Canada extended Canada's inflation-control target to December 31, 2016. The Bank of Canada uses three unconventional instruments to achieve the inflation target: "a conditional statement on the future path of the policy rate", quantitative easing, and credit easing.

As a result, interest rates and inflation eventually came down along with the value of the Canadian dollar. From 1991 to 2011 the inflation-targeting regime kept "price gains fairly reliable".

Following the Financial crisis of 2007–08 the narrow focus of inflation-targeting as a means of providing stable growth in the Canadian economy was questioned. By 2011, the then-Bank of Canada Governor Mark Carney argued that the central bank's mandate would allow for a more flexible inflation-targeting in specific situations where he would consider taking longer "than the typical six to eight quarters to return inflation to 2 per cent".

On July 15, 2015, the Bank of Canada announced that it was lowering its target for the overnight rate by another one-quarter percentage point, to 0.5 per cent "to try to stimulate an economy that appears to have failed to rebound meaningfully from the oil shock woes that dragged it into decline in the first quarter". According to the Bank of Canada announcement, in the first quarter of 2015, the total Consumer price index (CPI) inflation was about 1 per cent. This reflects "year-over-year price declines for consumer energy products". Core inflation in the first quarter of 2015 was about 2 per cent with an underlying trend in inflation at about 1.5 to 1.7 per cent.

In response to the Bank of Canada's July 15, 2015 rate adjustment, Prime Minister Stephen Harper explained that the economy was "being dragged down by forces beyond Canadian borders such as  global oil prices, the European debt crisis, and China's economic slowdown" which has made the global economy "fragile".

The Chinese stock market had lost about US$3 trillion of wealth by July 2015 when panicked investors sold stocks, which created declines in the commodities markets, which in turn negatively impacted resource-producing countries like Canada.

The Bank's main priority has been to keep inflation at a moderate level. As part of that strategy, interest rates were kept at a low level for almost seven years. Since September 2010, the key interest rate (overnight rate) was 0.5%. In mid 2017, inflation remained below the Bank's 2% target, (at 1.6%) mostly because of reductions in the cost of energy, food and automobiles; as well, the economy was in a continuing spurt with a predicted GDP growth of 2.8 percent by year end. Early on July 12, 2017, the bank issued a statement that the benchmark rate would be increased to 0.75%.

Following the COVID-19 pandemic, critics have pointed out that the Bank of Canada’s inflation-targeting has had unintended consequences, such as fuelling an increase in home prices and contributing to wealth inequalities by supporting higher equity values.

Key industries

In 2020, the Canadian economy had the following relative weighting by the industry as a percentage value of GDP:

Service sector
The service sector in Canada is vast and multifaceted, employing about three quarters of Canadians and accounting for 70% of GDP. The largest employer is the retail sector, employing almost 12% of Canadians. The retail industry is concentrated mainly in a small number of chain stores clustered together in shopping malls. In recent years, there has been an increase in the number of big-box stores, such as Wal-Mart (of the United States), Real Canadian Superstore, and Best Buy (of the United States). This has led to fewer workers in this sector and the migration of retail jobs to the suburbs.

The second-largest portion of the service sector is the business service, and it employs only a slightly smaller percentage of the population. This includes the financial services, real estate, and communications industries. This portion of the economy has been rapidly growing in recent years. It is largely concentrated in the major urban centres, especially Toronto, Montreal and Vancouver (see Banking in Canada).

The education and health sectors are two of Canada's largest, but both are primarily under the influence of the government. The health care industry has been quickly growing and is the third-largest in Canada. Its rapid growth has led to problems for governments who must find money to fund it.

Canada has an important high tech industry, and a burgeoning film, television, and entertainment industry creating content for local and international consumption (see Media in Canada). Tourism is of ever increasing importance, with the vast majority of international visitors coming from the United States. Casino gaming is currently the fastest-growing component of the Canadian tourism industry, contributing $5 billion in profits for Canadian governments and employing 41,000 Canadians as of 2001.

Manufacturing

The general pattern of development for wealthy nations was a transition from a raw material production-based economy to a manufacturing-based economy and then to a service-based economy. At its World War II peak in 1944, Canada's manufacturing sector accounted for 29% of GDP, declining to 10.37% in 2017. Canada has not suffered as greatly as most other rich, industrialized nations from the pains of the relative decline in the importance of manufacturing since the 1960s. A 2009 study by Statistics Canada also found that, while manufacturing declined as a relative percentage of GDP from 24.3% in the 1960s to 15.6% in 2005, manufacturing volumes between 1961 and 2005 kept pace with the overall growth in the volume index of GDP. Manufacturing in Canada was especially hit hard by the financial crisis of 2007–08. As of 2017, manufacturing accounts for 10% of Canada's GDP, a relative decline of more than 5% of GDP since 2005.

Central Canada is home to branch plants to all the major American and Japanese automobile makers and many parts factories owned by Canadian firms such as Magna International and Linamar Corporation.

Steel

Canada was the world's nineteenth-largest steel exporter in 2018. In year-to-date 2019 (through March), further referred to as YTD 2019, Canada exported 1.39 million metric tons of steel, a 22 percent decrease from 1.79 million metric tons in YTD 2018. Based on available data, Canada's exports represented about 1.5 percent of all steel exported globally in 2017. By volume, Canada's 2018 steel exports represented just over one-tenth the volume of the world's largest exporter, China. In value terms, steel represented 1.4 percent of the total goods Canada exported in 2018. The growth in exports in the decade since 2009 has been 29%. The largest producers in 2018 were ArcelorMittal, Essar Steel Algoma, and the first of those alone accounted for roughly half of Canadian steel production through its two subsidiaries. The top two markets for Canada's exports were its NAFTA partners, and by themselves accounted for 92 percent of exports by volume. Canada sent 83 percent of its steel exports to the United States in YTD 2019. The gap between domestic demand and domestic production increased to -2.4 million metric tons, up from -0.2 million metric tons in YTD 2018. In YTD 2019, exports as a share of production decreased to 41.6 percent from 53 percent in YTD 2018.

In 2017, heavy industry accounted for 10.2% of Canada's Greenhouse gas emissions.

Mining 

Canada is one of the largest producers of metals (as of 2019):

In 2019, the country was also the 4th largest world producer of sulfur; the world's 7th largest producer of molybdenum; the 7th worldwide producer of cobalt; the 8th largest world producer of lithium; the 8th largest world producer of zinc; the 13th largest world producer of gypsum; the 14th worldwide producer of antimony; the world's 10th largest producer of graphite; in addition to being the 6th largest world producer of salt. It was the 2nd largest producer in the world of uranium in 2018.

Energy

Canada has access to cheap sources of energy because of its geography. This has enabled the creation of several important industries, such as the large aluminum industries in British Columbia and Quebec. Canada is also one of the world's highest per capita consumers of energy.

Electricity

The electricity sector in Canada has played a significant role in the economic and political life of the country since the late 19th century. The sector is organized along provincial and territorial lines. In a majority of provinces, large government-owned integrated public utilities play a leading role in the generation, transmission and distribution of electricity.  Ontario and Alberta have created electricity markets in the last decade in order to increase investment and competition in this sector of the economy. In 2017, the electricity sector accounted for 10% of total national greenhouse gas emissions. Canada has substantial electricity trade with the neighbouring United States amounting to 72 TWh exports and 10 TWh imports in 2017.

Hydroelectricity accounted for 59% of all electric generation in Canada in 2016, making Canada the world's second-largest producer of hydroelectricity after China.  Since 1960, large hydroelectric projects, especially in Quebec, British Columbia, Manitoba and Newfoundland and Labrador, have significantly increased the country's generation capacity.

The second-largest single source of power (15% of the total) is nuclear power, with several plants in Ontario generating more than half of that province's electricity and one generator in New Brunswick. This makes Canada the world's sixth-largest electricity producer generated by nuclear power, producing 95 TWh in 2017.

Fossil fuels provide 19% of Canadian electric power, about half as coal (9% of the total), and the remainder a mix of natural gas and oil. Only five provinces use coal for electricity generation. Alberta, Saskatchewan, and Nova Scotia rely on coal for nearly half of their generation, while other provinces and territories use little or none. Alberta and Saskatchewan also use a substantial amount of natural gas. Remote communities, including all of Nunavut and much of the Northwest Territories, produce most of their electricity from diesel generators at high economic and environmental costs. The federal government has set up initiatives to reduce dependence on diesel-fired electricity.

Non-hydro renewables are a fast-growing portion of the total, at 7% in 2016.

Oil and Gas

Canada possesses extensive oil and gas resources centered in Alberta, and the Northern Territories but is also present in neighboring British Columbia and Saskatchewan. The vast Athabasca oil sands give Canada the world's third-largest reserves of oil after Saudi Arabia and Venezuela, according to USGS. The oil and gas industry represents 27% of Canada's total greenhouse gas emissions, an increase of 84% since 1990, mostly due to the development of the oil sands.

Historically, an important issue in Canadian politics is the interplay between the oil and energy industry in Western Canada and the industrial heartland of Southern Ontario. Foreign investment in Western oil projects has fueled Canada's rising dollar. This has raised the price of Ontario's manufacturing exports and made them less competitive, a problem similar to the decline of the manufacturing sector in the Netherlands.

The National Energy Policy of the early 1980s attempted to make Canada oil-sufficient and to ensure equal supply and price of oil in all parts of Canada, especially for the eastern manufacturing base. This policy proved deeply divisive as it forced Alberta to sell low-priced oil to eastern Canada. The policy was eliminated 5 years after it was first announced amid a collapse of oil prices in 1985. The new Prime Minister Brian Mulroney had campaigned against the policy in the 1984 Canadian federal election. One of the most controversial sections of the Canada–United States Free Trade Agreement of 1988 was a promise that Canada would never charge the United States more for energy than fellow Canadians.

Agriculture

Canada is also one of the world's largest suppliers of agricultural products, particularly wheat and other grains. Canada is a major exporter of agricultural products, to the United States and Asia. As with all other developed nations, the proportion of the population and GDP devoted to agriculture fell dramatically over the 20th century. The agriculture and agri-food manufacturing sector created $49.0 billion to Canada's GDP in 2015, accounting for 2.6% of total GDP.  This sector also accounts for 8.4% of Canada's Greenhouse gas emissions.

The Canadian agriculture industry receives significant government subsidies and support as with other developed nations. However, Canada has strongly supported reducing market influencing subsidies through the World Trade Organization. In 2000, Canada spent approximately CDN$4.6 billion on support for the industry. $2.32 billion was classified under the WTO designation of "green box" license, meaning it did not directly influence the market, such as money for research or disaster relief. All but $848.2 million were subsidies worth less than 5% of the value of the crops they were provided for.

Free-trade agreements

Free-trade agreements in force 

Source:
 Canada–Israel Free Trade Agreement (Entered into force January 1, 1997, modernization ongoing)
 Canada–Chile Free Trade Agreement (Entered into force July 5, 1997)
 Canada–Costa Rica Free Trade Agreement (Entered into force November 1, 2002, modernization ongoing)
 Canada–European Free Trade Association Free Trade Agreement (Iceland, Norway, Switzerland and Liechtenstein; entered into force July 1, 2009)
 Canada–Peru Free Trade Agreement (Entered into force August 1, 2009)
 Canada–Colombia Free Trade Agreement (Signed November 21, 2008, entered into force August 15, 2011; Canada's ratification of this FTA had been dependent upon Colombia's ratification of the "Agreement Concerning Annual Reports on Human Rights and Free Trade Between Canada and the Republic of Colombia" signed on May 27, 2010)
 Canada–Jordan Free Trade Agreement (Signed on June 28, 2009, entered into force October 1, 2012)
 Canada–Panama Free Trade Agreement (Signed on May 14, 2010, entered into force April 1, 2013)
 Canada–South Korea Free Trade Agreement (Signed on March 11, 2014, entered into force January 1, 2015)
 Canada–Ukraine Free Trade Agreement (Signed 11 July 2016, entered into force August 1, 2017)
 Comprehensive Economic and Trade Agreement with EU (signed 30 October 2016, entered into force 21 September 2017)
 Comprehensive and Progressive Agreement for Trans-Pacific Partnership (signed March 8, 2018, entered into force December 30, 2018)
 Canada-United States-Mexico Agreement (signed November 30, 2018, entered into force July 1, 2020)
 Canada–UK Trade Continuity Agreement (signed 9 December 2020, entered into force 1 April 2021)

Free-trade agreements no longer in force 
Source:
 Canada–U.S. Free Trade Agreement (signed October 12, 1987, entered into force January 1, 1989, later superseded by NAFTA)
 Trans-Pacific Partnership (concluded October 5, 2015, superseded by CPTPP)
 North American Free Trade Agreement (entered into force January 1, 1994, later superseded by CUSMA)

Ongoing free-trade agreements negotiations
Source:
Canada is negotiating bilateral FTAs with the following countries respectively trade blocs:
Caribbean Community (CARICOM)
Guatemala, Nicaragua and El Salvador
Dominican Republic
India
Japan
Morocco
Singapore
Andean Community (FTA's are already in force with Peru and Colombia)

Canada has been involved in negotiations to create the following regional trade blocks:

Canada and Central American Free Trade Agreement
Free Trade Area of the Americas (FTAA)

Political issues

Relations with the U.S. 

Canada and the United States share a common trading relationship. Canada's job market continues to perform well along with the US, reaching a 30-year low in the unemployment rate in December 2006, following 14 consecutive years of employment growth.

The United States is by far Canada's largest trading partner, with more than $1.7 billion CAD in trade per day in 2005. In 2009, 73% of Canada's exports went to the United States, and 63% of Canada's imports were from the United States. Trade with Canada makes up 23% of the United States' exports and 17% of its imports.  By comparison, in 2005 this was more than U.S. trade with all countries in the European Union combined, and well over twice U.S. trade with all the countries of Latin America combined.  Just the two-way trade that crosses the Ambassador Bridge between Michigan and Ontario equals all U.S. exports to Japan. Canada's importance to the United States is not just a border-state phenomenon: Canada is the leading export market for 35 of 50 U.S. states, and is the United States' largest foreign supplier of energy.

Bilateral trade increased by 52% between 1989, when the U.S.–Canada Free Trade Agreement (FTA) went into effect, and 1994, when the North American Free Trade Agreement (NAFTA) superseded it. Trade has since increased by 40%. NAFTA continues the FTA's moves toward reducing trade barriers and establishing agreed-upon trade rules. It also resolves some long-standing bilateral irritants and liberalizes rules in several areas, including agriculture, services, energy, financial services, investment, and government procurement. NAFTA forms the largest trading area in the world, embracing the 405 million people of the three North American countries.

The largest component of U.S.–Canada trade is in the commodity sector.

The U.S. is Canada's largest agricultural export market, taking well over half of all Canadian food exports. Nearly two-thirds of Canada's forest products, including pulp and paper, are exported to the United States; 72% of Canada's total newsprint production also is exported to the U.S.

At $73.6 billion in 2004, U.S.-Canada trade in energy is the largest U.S. energy trading relationship, with the overwhelming majority ($66.7 billion) being exports from Canada. The primary components of U.S. energy trade with Canada are petroleum, natural gas, and electricity. Canada is the United States' largest oil supplier and the fifth-largest energy producing country in the world. Canada provides about 16% of U.S. oil imports and 14% of total U.S. consumption of natural gas. The United States and Canada's national electricity grids are linked, and both countries share hydropower facilities on the western borders.

While most of U.S.-Canada trade flows smoothly, there are occasionally bilateral trade disputes, particularly in the agricultural and cultural fields. Usually these issues are resolved through bilateral consultative forums or referral to World Trade Organization (WTO) or NAFTA dispute resolution. In May 1999, the U.S. and Canadian governments negotiated an agreement on magazines that provides increased access for the U.S. publishing industry to the Canadian market. The United States and Canada also have resolved several major issues involving fisheries. By common agreement, the two countries submitted a Gulf of Maine boundary dispute to the International Court of Justice in 1981; both accepted the court's October 12, 1984 ruling which demarcated the territorial sea boundary. A current issue between the United States and Canada is the ongoing softwood lumber dispute, as the U.S. alleges that Canada unfairly subsidizes its forestry industry.

In 1990, the United States and Canada signed a bilateral Fisheries Enforcement Agreement, which has served to deter illegal fishing activity and reduce the risk of injury during fisheries enforcement incidents. The U.S. and Canada signed a Pacific Salmon Agreement in June 1999 that settled differences over implementation of the 1985 Pacific Salmon Treaty for the next decade.

Canada and the United States signed an aviation agreement during Bill Clinton's visit to Canada in February 1995, and air traffic between the two countries has increased dramatically as a result. The two countries also share in operation of the St. Lawrence Seaway, connecting the Great Lakes to the Atlantic Ocean.

The U.S. remains Canada's largest foreign investor and the most popular destination for Canadian foreign investments. In 2018, the stock of U.S. direct investment in Canada totaled $406 billion, while the stock of Canadian investment in the U.S. totaled $595 billion, or 46% of the overall CDIA stock for 2018. This made Canada the second largest investing country in the U.S. for 2018 US investments are primarily directed at Canada's mining and smelting industries, petroleum, chemicals, the manufacture of machinery and transportation equipment, and finance, while Canadian investment in the United States is concentrated in manufacturing, wholesale trade, real estate, petroleum, finance, insurance and other services.

Debt

Canadian Government Debt
Canadian government debt, also called Canada's public debt, is the liabilities of the government sector.  For 2019 (the fiscal year ending 31 March 2020), total financial liabilities or gross debt was $2434 billion for the consolidated Canadian general government (federal, provincial, territorial, and local governments combined).  This corresponds to 105.3% as a ratio of GDP (GDP was $2311 billion).  Of the $2434 billion, $1146 billion or 47% was federal (central) government liabilities (49.6% as a ratio of GDP).  Provincial government liabilities comprise most of the remaining liabilities.

Household Debt
Household debt, the amount of money that all adults in the household owe financial institutions, includes consumer debt and mortgage loans. In March 2015, the International Monetary Fund reported that Canada's high household debt was one of two vulnerable domestic areas in Canada's economy; the second is its overheated housing market.

According to Statistics Canada, total household credit as of July 2019 was CAD$2.2 trillion. According to Philip Cross of the Fraser Institute, in May 2015, while the Canadian household debt-to-income ratio is similar to that in the US, however lending standards in Canada are tighter than those in the United States to protect against high-risk borrowers taking out unsustainable debt.

Mergers and Acquisition 

Since 1985, 63,755 deals in- and outbound Canada have been announced, with an overall value of US$3.7 billion. Almost 50% of the targets of Canadian companies (outbound deals) have a parent company in the US. Inbound deals are 82% percent from the US.

Here is a list of the biggest deals in Canadian history:

See also

Canada's Global Markets Action Plan
Comparison of Canadian and American economies
Economy of Alberta
Economy of Ontario
Economy of Quebec
Economy of Saskatchewan
History of the petroleum industry in Canada
List of Median household income of cities in Canada
List of Commonwealth of Nations countries by GDP
List of Canadian provinces and territories by gross domestic product

Notes

References

Further reading

 Howlett, Michael and M. Ramesh. Political Economy of Canada: An Introduction. Toronto: McClelland and Stewart, 1992.
 Wallace, Iain, A Geography of the Canadian Economy. Don Mills: Oxford University Press, 2002.

External links

Statistics Canada
Department of Finance Canada
Bank of Canada
Canada - OECD
Canada profile at the CIA World Factbook
Canada profile at The World Bank
Canada Exports and Imports

 
Canada
Canada